Ian McShane (born 20 December 1992) is a Scottish professional footballer who plays as a midfielder for Darvel in the Scottish Juniors, having previously played for Queen of the South, Ross County, St Mirren and Falkirk. McShane is the younger cousin of former Hamilton Academical player John McShane and is a minority shareholder in MacIntyre Sheds of Beauly.

Career

Queen of the South
McShane is a product of the youth policy of Dumfries club Queen of the South. McShane figured in the 2010 pre-season set up for Queens before being formally announced on the club website on 25 July 2010 as having officially signed a senior player's contract along with fellow youth team players Dan Orsi, Steven Degnan and Gavin Reilly. McShane debuted for Queens in a 5–0 Scottish Challenge Cup victory versus East Fife on 4 September 2010. McShane's league debut was on 15 January 2011, as a 90th-minute substitute in the 3–0 away win versus Falkirk.

Ross County
On 25 May 2015, McShane signed for Ross County on a three-year contract. McShane made his debut on 1 August 2015, in a 2–0 defeat versus Celtic. McShane scored his first two goals for County in a 3–2 loss to Aberdeen, a low-driven freekick and a long range effort. It was announced on 23 May 2017 that McShane had been instructed by the Staggies to find another club.

St Mirren
On 13 July 2017, McShane signed for Scottish Championship club St Mirren on a two-year contract.

Falkirk
McShane signed for Falkirk in January 2019 on an 18-month contract. McShane played regularly for the Bairns, starting sixteen competitive first-team matches and scored three goals. Falkirk were relegated on the last game of the season, finishing bottom of the table.

Darvel
In June 2020 McShane made the switch to Scottish Junior club Darvel.

Career statistics

Honours

Club
Ross County
Scottish League Cup: 2015–16

References

External links

Scottish footballers
Living people
Queen of the South F.C. players
Ross County F.C. players
1992 births
Footballers from Bellshill
Association football midfielders
Scottish Football League players
Scottish Professional Football League players
St Mirren F.C. players
Falkirk F.C. players
West of Scotland Football League players